Kate Garry Hudson (born April 19, 1979) is an American actress. She has received various accolades, including a Golden Globe Award and a nomination for an Academy Award.

Born to singer Bill Hudson and actress Goldie Hawn, Hudson made her film debut in the 1998 drama Desert Blue, which was followed by supporting roles in several films. She rose to prominence with her portrayal of Penny Lane in Cameron Crowe's musical drama Almost Famous (2000), for which she won a Golden Globe for Best Supporting Actress and received an Oscar nomination in the same category.

Throughout the 2000s, Hudson starred in a succession of romantic comedies, most notably in How to Lose a Guy in 10 Days (2003),  You, Me and Dupree (2006), Fool's Gold (2008), and Bride Wars (2009). On television, she had a recurring role in the musical series Glee (2012–2013) and a starring role in the second season of Truth Be Told (2022). Her other film credits include The Skeleton Key (2005), Nine (2009), Rock the Kasbah (2015), Deepwater Horizon (2016), Mother's Day (2016), Music (2021), and Glass Onion (2022).

Hudson is a co-founder of the fitness brand and membership program Fabletics, operated by TechStyle Fashion Group. She is also the author of the non-fiction books Pretty Happy: Healthy Ways to Love Your Body (2016) and Pretty Fun: Creating and Celebrating a Lifetime of Tradition (2017).

Early life 
Hudson was born in Los Angeles, California, the daughter of Academy Award-winning actress Goldie Hawn and Bill Hudson, an actor, comedian, and musician. Her parents divorced when she was 18 months old and she and her older brother, actor Oliver Hudson, were raised in Snowmass, Colorado, and Pacific Palisades, California by her mother and her mother's longtime boyfriend, actor Kurt Russell. Hudson's ancestry is Italian (from her paternal grandmother), Hungarian Jewish (from her maternal grandmother), and the remainder a mix of English and some German. She was raised Jewish; like her mother, she also practices Buddhism.

Hudson has stated that her biological father "doesn't know me from a hole in the wall", and she considers Russell her father. Hudson has described her mother as "the woman that I've learned the most from, and who I look up to, who has conducted her life in a way that I can look up to". She has four half-siblings: Emily and Zachary Hudson, from her biological father's later marriage to actress Cindy Williams; Lalania Hudson, from his relationship with another woman; and Wyatt Russell, from her mother's relationship with Kurt Russell.

In 1997, she graduated from Crossroads, a college preparatory school in Santa Monica. She was accepted to New York University, but chose to pursue an acting career instead of an undergraduate degree.

Career

Beginnings and Almost Famous (1996–2001) 
At age 11, Hudson performed on stage at the Santa Monica Playhouse. She made her film debut in the dramedy Desert Blue (1998), and subsequently appeared in the romantic comedy 200 Cigarettes (1999). She took on the roles of a college student in the psychological thriller Gossip, the lesbian daughter of the titular character in the dramedy Dr. T & the Women and one of the leading roles in the romantic comedy About Adam, all of which were released throughout 2000.

Her breakthrough came with the role of a veteran groupie in Cameron Crowe's semi-autobiographical dramedy Almost Famous (2000). She "hung in and had turned down leads in other movies just to play the part" and soon obtained it "because of her loyalty", according to Crowe. For her performance, she won the Golden Globe Award for Best Supporting Actress and was nominated for an Academy Award for Best Supporting Actress. Entertainment Weekly put it on its end-of-the-decade, "best-of" list, saying, "This power ballad of a movie also happens to be Crowe's greatest (and most personal) film thanks to the golden gods of Stillwater and their biggest fan, Kate Hudson's incomparable Penny Lane." She worked hard in avoiding association with her well-known parents, as she did not want to be perceived as someone who "rode on somebody's coattails".

Romantic comedies (2002–2009)

In 2002, Hudson appeared in the remake of the historical romance The Four Feathers, as the fiancée of a young British officer (played by Heath Ledger). The film was panned by critics and had a lukewarm box office response. In her next film, the romantic comedy How to Lose a Guy in 10 Days (2003), Hudson starred with Matthew McConaughey, as a writer for a women's magazine who, for an article, starts dating a guy and trying to drive him away using only the "classic mistakes women make" in relationships. The film was a box office success, grossing over US$100 million upon its release. She also starred opposite Naomi Watts in the Merchant-Ivory film Le Divorce (2003), portraying a woman who, with her sister, dispute the ownership of a painting by Georges de La Tour with the family of her former brother-in-law. Entertainment Weekly gave the film a "C" rating and wrote: "I'm disappointed to report that Hudson and Watts have no chemistry as sisters".

Her next romantic comedies, Alex & Emma (2003), in which she played a stubborn stenographer, and Raising Helen (2004), taking on the role of a young woman who becomes the guardian of her deceased sister's children, were released to varying degrees of success. In 2005, Hudson starred in the supernatural thriller The Skeleton Key, as a young hospice nurse who acquires a job at a New Orleans plantation home, and becomes entangled in a supernatural mystery involving the house. In its review, The Washington Post, describing her, wrote: "Hudson, who dials back her native, Goldie-given charm here to give Caroline a no-nonsense brusqueness, manages to convincingly convey a fearless bullheadedness rather than less sympathetic naivete". The film was a box office hit, grossing over US$91.9 million worldwide ($47.9 million in North America). Her next film, the comedy You, Me and Dupree, in which she appeared with Owen Wilson and Matt Dillon as one half of a couple who allows an unemployed friend to move in, grossed US$21.5 million on its opening weekend of July 14, 2006. It eventually made US$130.4 million worldwide.

In 2007, Hudson directed the short film Cutlass, one of Glamour magazine's "Reel Moments" based on readers' personal essays, which starred Kurt Russell, Dakota Fanning, Virginia Madsen, Chevy Chase and Kristen Stewart. In the romantic comedy Fool's Gold (2008), her second film with Matthew McConaughey, Hudson took on the role a divorced woman who returns with her former husband while searching for a lost treasure. She was certified in scuba diving in the Great Barrier Reef for the underwater scenes. The film made US$111.2 million worldwide. In My Best Friend's Girl, another romantic comedy released in 2008, Hudson played the colleague of an amiable guy (Jason Biggs). Despite negative reviews, it was a moderate commercial success.

Hudson starred in Bride Wars (2009), alongside Anne Hathaway, playing two best friends who become rivals after their weddings are scheduled on the same day. The film was named among the 10 worst chick flicks of all time by Time in 2010, but was successful financially, grossing US$114.6 million globally. Her next film was the musical Nine, directed by Rob Marshall, in which she played a Vogue fashion journalist, alongside Daniel Day-Lewis, Marion Cotillard, Penélope Cruz, Nicole Kidman, and Judi Dench. The film was acclaimed by critics and Hudson garnered praise for her dancing skills, showcased in a 1960s-inspired original piece called "Cinema Italiano", which was written specifically for her character.

Independent films and Glee (2010–present)
Hudson starred with Casey Affleck and Jessica Alba, as the wife of a West Texas serial killer, in the film adaptation The Killer Inside Me, which premiered at the 2010 Sundance Film Festival. In 2011, Hudson played a quickwitted, carefree ad executive in the romantic comedy film A Little Bit of Heaven, and a party girl in another romantic comedy, Something Borrowed, based on Emily Giffin's novel of the same name. In is review for the latter, Detroit News remarked: "Kate Hudson looks exhausted, as if she is as tired of wading through another one of her feckless duds as we are of watching them". While A Little Bit of Heaven found a limited release in theaters, Something Borrowed was a moderate commercial success.

In 2012, Hudson was cast on the Fox teen comedy series Glee, in the recurring role of Cassandra July, a dance teacher at the fictitious New York Academy of the Dramatic Arts. In 2013, Hudson appeared in the political thriller The Reluctant Fundamentalist, as a photographer and the girlfriend of a professor at the University of Lahore. In 2014, she starred in the comedy Wish I Was Here, as the wife of a struggling actor, and the thriller Good People, as one half of a couple who fall into severe debt while renovating their family's home. The aforementioned films received a limited release and mixed reviews from critics. In Rock the Kasbah (2015), Hudson played a top-hatted hooker with a heart of gold who befriends a has-been actor manager (Bill Murray) in Afghanistan. Despite a US$15 million budget, the film only made US$3 million at the North American box office.

Hudson voiced a crazy ribbon-dancing panda in the DreamWorks Animation film Kung Fu Panda 3 (2016), which grossed US$521.1 million globally, and became her most widely seen film. She starred as a woman married to an Indian man and the sister of a lesbian woman, both of which had not told their conservative parents, in the romantic comedy Mother's Day (2016), directed by Garry Marshall and opposite Julia Roberts, Timothy Olyphant, and Jason Sudeikis. The film was panned by critics and a moderate commercial success. She next played the wife of a chief electronics technician (Mark Wahlberg) in the drama Deepwater Horizon, based on the Deepwater Horizon explosion. While critical response was positive, the film was only slightly profitable, making US$121.8 million on a budget of around US$110 million.

In the 2017 film Marshall, Hudson portrayed an employer accusing her black chauffeur of rape. It received positive reviews from critics but found a limited audience in theaters. In 2019, she is set to star in Blood Moon, a fantasy-adventure film by writer-director Ana Lily Amirpour. In 2021, Hudson co-starred as Kazu Gamble in musical film Music, co-written and directed by Sia. She received her second Golden Globe nomination for her work on the film.  She will also star alongside Michael Shannon in Shriver directed by Michael Maren. In 2022, Hudson co-starred in Glass Onion: A Knives Out Mystery, playing the role of Birdie, a Manhattan supermodel turned fashion designer involved in a murder mystery.

Other ventures

In 2013, Hudson, in a partnership with online fashion retailer TechStyle Fashion Group, launched her own line of workout clothes and active wear, Fabletics, which currently operates 25 stores in the United States. The venture became her focus, and in a 2018 interview, Hudson remarked: "I work more on Fabletics now than I do on movies."

In 2016, Hudson released her first book, Pretty Happy: Healthy Ways to Love Your Body. In 2017, she released her second book, Pretty Fun: Creating and Celebrating a Lifetime of Tradition.

In August 2018, Hudson and New York & Company announced their partnership, a multi-year deal to represent the ambassador for the company’s US$200 million Soho Jeans collection, and to develop her own fashion line. In 2018, Hudson collaborated with her mother Goldie to create a capsule collection, with 50 percent of net proceeds will benefit MindUP, a program within the Goldie Hawn Foundation.

In November 2019, Hudson launched King St. Vodka, a vodka from California. A podcast, Sibling Revelry, by Kate and her brother Oliver, resulted in "playfully bickering" while promoting it on The Late Show With Stephen Colbert in 2022.

Personal life 

In early 2006, Hudson sued the British version of the National Enquirer after it reported she had an eating disorder, describing her as "painfully thin". Hudson said the tabloid's statements were "a blatant lie" and she was concerned about the impact the false report could have on impressionable young women. The newspaper apologized and compensated her.

Hudson says that she does not enjoy seeing herself on screen, saying, "I get cold and I shake and I sweat" when watching her performances for the first time.

In 2016, Hudson said: "Meditation has been the most helpful and life-changing thing for me. You can feel the difference when you meditate on a regular basis. At least I can... I started practicing transcendental meditation a year and a half ago so I meditate 20 minutes in the morning and I try to do another 20 minutes in the afternoon."

Relationships
Hudson married Chris Robinson, lead singer for the Black Crowes, on December 31, 2000, in Aspen, Colorado. Their son was born in January 2004. They traveled together during Hudson's film shoots and Robinson's music tours. On August 14, 2006, Hudson's publicist announced that she and Robinson had separated. On November 18, 2006, Robinson filed divorce papers, citing "irreconcilable differences". The divorce was finalized on October 22, 2007, with Hudson granted joint custody.

In early 2010, Hudson began dating Muse lead vocalist and guitarist Matt Bellamy. They became engaged in April 2011 and their son was born in July 2011. On December 9, 2014, they announced they had ended their engagement. They are reported to be on good terms with one another and co-parenting their son.

In December 2016, Hudson had her first date with Danny Fujikawa, a musician, actor, and co-owner of a record company. They met when she was 23, through her best friends, Sara Foster and Erin Foster, who are his stepsisters. On April 6, 2018, Hudson announced she was expecting her first child with Fujikawa. On October 2, 2018, via Instagram, she announced the birth of their daughter Rani, who they named after his grandfather, Ron Fujikawa. On September 13, 2021, they announced their engagement.

Filmography

Film

Television

Other credits

Published works

Awards and nominations 

Hudson has received various awards and nominations throughout her career. In 2000, her role as Penny Lane in Cameron Crowe's drama film Almost Famous earned her worldwide recognition and critical plaudits, including nominations for an Academy Award (Oscar), a Golden Globe Award, a Satellite Award, a Critics' Choice Award and a Screen Actors Guild Award for Best Supporting Actress and a BAFTA Award for Best Actress; winning the Golden Globe and Satellite Award. In 2012, her role in the film was recognized as the second-best performance by an actress in a supporting role of the 2000s decade by the Awards Circuit Community.

Hudson has also received recognition for her roles in the films: How to Lose a Guy in 10 Days, Alex & Emma (both 2003), Raising Helen (2004), You, Me and Dupree (2006), Fool's Gold, My Best Friend's Girl (both 2008), Bride Wars, Nine (both 2009), Something Borrowed (2011), Wish I Was Here (2014), Mother's Day (2016), and Music (2021); with the latter garnering controversy around its misinterpretation of the autism community and earned both Hudson and her co-star Maddie Ziegler Golden Raspberry Awards for Worst Actress and Worst Supporting Actress, respectively. Simultaneously, Hudson garnered her second Golden Globe nomination for the same role. Her role in Nine earned Hudson and her co-stars the Satellite Award for Best Cast – Motion Picture and a SAG Award nomination in the same category.

References

External links 

1979 births
Living people
20th-century American actresses
21st-century American actresses
Actresses from Los Angeles
American Buddhists
American expatriates in the United Kingdom
American film actresses
Film producers from California
American people of English descent
American people of German descent
American people of Hungarian-Jewish descent
American people of Italian descent
American television actresses
American voice actresses
American women film producers
American women podcasters
American podcasters
Best Supporting Actress Golden Globe (film) winners
Crossroads School alumni
Hudson family (show business)
Jewish American actresses
21st-century American Jews